

National Touch League Results by Year
These are results for the National Touch League in Australia.

Most successful NTL Permits by division (1997 – 2008)

Touch competitions